Olga Mikhaylvna  Bogoslovskaya (born May 20, 1964) is a retired Russian athlete who competed mainly in the 100 metres. She currently works as a sports journalist.

She competed for the Unified Team at the age of 28 in the 1992 Summer Olympics held in Barcelona, Spain in the 4 x 100 metres with her teammates Galina Malchugina, Marina Trandenkova and Irina Privalova who had finished third in the 100 metres. Her team recorded a time of 42.16, and she received a silver medal–second only to the United States team of Evelyn Ashford, Esther Jones, Carlette Guidry, Gwen Torrence, and Michelle Finn, who recorded a time of 42.11. She works as an athletics correspondent for Match TV and was married to Dmitry Guberniev.

Doping disqualification
In 1994, a doping test taken by Bogoslovskaya at the famous Cologne laboratory of Manfred Donike proved positive. The substance was obviously a steroid. After receiving a two-year disqualification and training for one more season, Bogoslovskaya decided to end her career.

References

External links
 profile
 sports-reference.com

1964 births
Living people
Russian female sprinters
Athletes (track and field) at the 1992 Summer Olympics
Olympic athletes of the Unified Team
Olympic silver medalists for the Unified Team
Soviet sportspeople in doping cases
Russian sportspeople in doping cases
World Athletics Championships medalists
Russian sports journalists
Medalists at the 1992 Summer Olympics
Olympic silver medalists in athletics (track and field)
World Athletics Championships winners
Olympic female sprinters